Cohocton may refer to:

 Cohocton (town), New York
 Cohocton (village), New York
 Cohocton River, a tributary of the Chemung River